Christiane Longère (born 11 April 1953) is a French politician. She represented the department of Loire in the French Senate as a Union for a Popular Movement member from 17 April 2010 to 30 September 2011.

Longère was elected to the Senate in a 2010 by-election to replace Michel Thiollière. She was defeated when she ran for reelection in 2011. She has served as mayor of Briennon since 1997.

References 

1953 births
Living people
French Senators of the Fifth Republic
Union for a Popular Movement politicians
Women mayors of places in France
People from Loire (department)
20th-century French women politicians
21st-century French women politicians
Women members of the Senate (France)
Senators of Loire (department)